Kalitu may refer to:
 Kalitu, Hormozgan
 Kalitu, Kerman